Claire Walsh (born 27 May 1942) is an Irish middle-distance runner. She competed in the women's 800 metres at the 1972 Summer Olympics.

References

1942 births
Living people
Athletes (track and field) at the 1972 Summer Olympics
Irish female middle-distance runners
Olympic athletes of Ireland
Place of birth missing (living people)